Galloisiana olgae is a species of insect in the family Grylloblattidae. Its type locality is Mount Olga, Russia.

References

Grylloblattidae
Insects of Russia